Mesuji River is a river in Lampung province, Sumatra island, Indonesia, about 250 km northwest of the capital Jakarta.

Geography
The river flows in the southeast area of Sumatra with predominantly tropical rainforest climate (designated as Af in the Köppen-Geiger climate classification). The annual average temperature in the area is 26 °C. The warmest month is August, when the average temperature is around 28 °C, and the coldest is May, at 25 °C. The average annual rainfall is 3248 mm. The wettest month is December, with an average of 547 mm rainfall, and the driest is September, with 40 mm rainfall.

See also
List of rivers of Indonesia
List of rivers of Sumatra

References

Rivers of Lampung
Rivers of Indonesia